Arthur M. Van Tone (September 30, 1918 – August 9, 1990) was an American football player and coach.  He played professionally in the National Football League (NFL) with the Detroit Lions from 1943 to 1946.  Van Tone served as the head football coach at Austin Peay State College—now known as Austin Peay State University—from 1960 to 1962, compiling a record of 4–26.  Before he was hired at Austin Peay in January 1960, he coached high school football, at Lauren High School in Laurel, Mississippi from  1948 to 1954 and Bay High School in Panama City, Florida from 1955 to 1959.

Head coaching record

College

References

External links
 
 

1918 births
1990 deaths
Austin Peay Governors football coaches
Detroit Lions players
Southern Miss Golden Eagles football players
High school football coaches in Florida
High school football coaches in Mississippi
People from Ottawa, Ohio